Semon Rohloff (born 19 April 1970) is a former synchronized swimmer from Australia.

References 

1970 births
Living people
Australian synchronised swimmers
Olympic synchronised swimmers of Australia
Synchronized swimmers at the 1988 Summer Olympics
Synchronized swimmers at the 1992 Summer Olympics
Commonwealth Games medallists in synchronised swimming
Commonwealth Games bronze medallists for Australia
Synchronised swimmers at the 1990 Commonwealth Games
Medallists at the 1990 Commonwealth Games